The AG-16 was an AG-class  submarine, designed by the American Holland Torpedo Boat Company/Electric Boat Company, built for the Imperial Russian Navy during World War I. The submarine was fabricated in Canada, shipped to Russia and reassembled for service with the Baltic Fleet. The boat was originally named AG-13, but was redesignated AG-16 after AG-15 sank and later repaired in 1917. She was scuttled by the Russians at Hanko in April 1918.

Attempts were made by the Finns to salvage the vessel: the boat was raised in 1918 and transferred to Helsinki for repair, but this proved too costly and she was scrapped in 1929.

Description
AG-13 was a single-hulled submarine, with a pressure hull divided into five watertight compartments. She displaced  on the surface and  submerged.

The submarine had two 3-bladed propellers, each of which was driven by a  diesel engine as well as a  electric motors. This arrangement gave AG-22 a maximum speed of  while surfaced and  submerged.

The AG-class submarines were equipped with four  torpedo tubes in the bow and carried eight torpedoes. For surface combat they had one  deck gun.

Construction and service

In Russian service
The Holland 602 design was widely exported during World War I and the Imperial Russian Navy ordered a total of 17, in three batches, of a version known as the American Holland-class (AG in Russian for Amerikansky Golland (American Holland)). The submarines were to be built in Canada as knock-down kits for assembly in Russia.

Components for the first batch of five submarines were assembled in Barnet, near Vancouver, British Columbia, Canada, and shipped to Vladivostok. There they were loaded onto the Trans-Siberian Railroad and transported to Saint Petersburg where they were assembled by the Baltic Works by June 1916. AG-13 was redesignated AG-16 in 1917. During World War I Russian and British submarines operated from bases in Finland. The Russian submarines of Holland type (AG-11, AG-12, AG-15 and AG-16) were scuttled in the harbor of Hanko on 3 April 1918 just prior to the German landing there.

In Finnish hands
AG-12 and AG-16 seemed to be in relatively good shape and the Finns decided to salvage them. AG-16 was transferred to Helsinki and the Finns asked both Germany and Electric Boat for estimates on the cost of repairs. The latter was so costly so only the German alternative remained. German experts evaluated AG-16, but the Finnish government never provided funds for the repairing of the submarine. The repairs would be costly and no shipyard were prepared to guarantee the results. The submarine was stored on dry land until 1929 when the Finnish government finally agreed on the new Fleet program, which also included new submarines. AG-16 was then scrapped.

Notes

Bibliography 
 Building Submarines for Russia in Burrard Inlet by W.Kaye Lamb published in BC Studies No.71 Autumn, 1986

 

American Holland-class submarines
Ships built in Canada
Ships built in Russia
1916 ships
World War I submarines of Russia
Submarines of the Finnish Navy
Maritime incidents in 1918
Scuttled vessels
Shipwrecks of Finland
Shipwrecks in the Gulf of Finland
World War I shipwrecks in the Baltic Sea